Michael Rosen  (17 October 1927 – 2 May 2018) was the president of the Royal College of Anaesthetists from 1988 to 1991.

References

1927 births
2018 deaths
Scottish anaesthetists
Presidents of the Royal College of Anaesthetists